Mount Collard is a mountain rising to , standing  south of Mount Perov at the southern extremity of the Belgica Mountains. It was discovered by the Belgian Antarctic Expedition, 1957–58, under G. de Gerlache and named by him for Leo Collard, Belgian Minister of Public Instruction.

References 

Mountains of Queen Maud Land
Prince Harald Coast